Olivia Jay Levicki (née Thompson; born 20 January 1993) is an Australian rules footballer for the Port Adelaide Football Club in the AFL Women's (AFLW) competition. She has also played professional basketball for the Perth Lynx of the Women's National Basketball League (WNBL).

Basketball Career

WNBL
Thompson began her professional career in 2009, for the Australian Institute of Sport. In 2012, she signed with the Townsville Fire. During her time there, she played in two consecutive WNBL Grand Finals, falling short on both occasions. In 2014, she signed with the Melbourne Boomers. In 2016, Thompson re-signed with the Boomers for a third season.

On 1 June 2017, Thompson signed with the Perth Lynx for the 2017–18 WNBL season.

State League
In 2012 and 2013, Thompson played for her junior association, the Forestville Eagles, in the Premier League during the WNBL off-seasons. In 2014, she joined the Brisbane Spartans and helped the team win the SEABL Championship. After a season with the Ballarat Rush in 2015, she returned to the Forestville Eagles in 2016 and 2017. Thompson was named the fairest and most brilliant player of the 2016 Premier League season, with her first Halls Medal success making her the club's first winner since 1998. She made it a clean sweep, also being named the Premier League's MVP and selected into the All Star Five. In 2017, Thompson was again named to the Premier League All Star Five, after averaging 22.1 points, 13.8 rebounds and 3.8 assists per game with Forestville.

National team
Thompson made her national team debut at the 2009 FIBA Oceania Under-16 Championship in Brisbane, where she took home Gold and secured Australia's place at the inaugural Under-17 World Championship the following year. Thompson would go on to represent Australia at the FIBA World Championship in France where Australia placed seventh. She also represented Australia at both the 2013 and 2015 Universiades in Kazan, Russia and Gwangju, South Korea respectively.

Australian rules football career

Port Adelaide Football Club
After she was spotted playing basketball for South Adelaide, Levicki was scouted by Erin Phillips, who contacted her via Instagram, asking if she was interested in trying Australian rules football.

Personal life
Olivia is married to former  and  SANFL player Patrick Levicki.

References

1993 births
Living people
Australian Institute of Sport basketball (WNBL) players
Australian women's basketball players
Townsville Fire players
Melbourne Boomers players
Perth Lynx players
Sportswomen from South Australia
Universiade medalists in basketball
Universiade bronze medalists for Australia
Forwards (basketball)
Medalists at the 2013 Summer Universiade